Aivarnadu  is a village in the southern state of Karnataka, India. It is located in the Sulya taluk of Dakshina Kannada district.

See also
 Mangalore
 Dakshina Kannada
 Districts of Karnataka

References

External links
 http://Dakshina Kannada.nic.in/

Villages in Dakshina Kannada district